Duke Street may refer to:

Places

United Kingdom
 Duke Street, Barrow-in-Furness, a road through the centre and Hindpool area of Barrow-in-Furness
 Duke Street, Devonport (Plymouth), named after HMS Duke launched in 1777 from Devonport Dockyard
 Duke Street, Sheffield
 Duke Street, Windle, St Helens
 Duke Street, Liverpool
 Duke Street, Ipswich, Suffolk
 Duke Street, Glasgow
 Duke Street Prison, a prison in Glasgow
 Duke Street railway station, a railway station in Glasgow
 Duke Street, Bath, in Bath, Somerset, England
 Duke Street, Edinburgh

London
 Duke Street, Clerkenwell, WC1, connected to Vere Street and, via Prince's Street, to Drury Lane 
 Duke Street, Westminster, WC2, originally connecting George Street, Villiers Street, Buckingham Street and Of Alley (named for George Villiers, 2nd Duke of Buckingham), but now replaced by John Adam Street
 Duke Street, Marylebone, W1
 The Duchess of Duke Street, a BBC TV drama
 Duke Street, St James's, SW1, connecting Piccadilly and Pall Mall across Jermyn Street
 Duke Street, Richmond, TW9
 Duke Street Baptist Church, a church in London
 Duke Street, Sutton, SM1

Elsewhere
 Duke Street, Kangaroo Point, Brisbane, in Australia
 Duke Street, Kingston, Jamaica
 Duke Street, in Singapore
 Duke Street, Norfolk, Virginia
 Virginia State Route 236, which is named Duke Street in Alexandria, Virginia

Companies
 Duke Street Capital, a European private equity firm
 Duke Street Records, a Canadian record label